Somerset Island (Inuktitut Kuuganajuk) is a large, uninhabited island of the Arctic Archipelago, that is part of the Canadian territory of Nunavut. The island is separated from Cornwallis Island and Devon Island to the north by the Parry Channel, from Baffin Island to the east by Prince Regent Inlet, from the Boothia Peninsula to the south by Bellot Strait, and from Prince of Wales Island to the west by Peel Sound.

History
Around 1000 AD, the north coast of Somerset Island was inhabited by the Thule people, as evidenced by whale bones, tunnels and stone ruins.

William Edward Parry was the first documented European to sight the island in 1819.

HMS Fury was an Arctic exploration ship commanded by Henry Parkyns Hoppner. She was damaged by ice while overwintering and was abandoned on 25 August 1825, at what has since been called Fury Beach on Somerset Island. Her stores were unloaded onto the beach and later came to the rescue of John Ross, who travelled overland to the abandoned cache when he lost his ship further south in the Gulf of Boothia on his 1829 expedition.

James Clark Ross was the nephew of John Ross, and accompanied him on the 1829 expedition. In late 1848, James Clark Ross returned to Somerset Island by landing two ships at Port Leopold on the northeast coast to winter. In April the following year, he launched an exploration of the island by sledge.

Roald Amundsen transited the passage between the Island and the Prince of Wales Island in the Gjøa in the first successful traverse of the Northwest Passage in 1904.  Henry Larsen transited the passage, in the St Roch in the second successful transit in 1943. But he found this route was dangerously icebound, and also too shallow for commercial travel.

The Fort Ross trading post was established and run by the Hudson's Bay Company at the southeastern end of the island from 1937 to 1948. When it was closed, the island was left uninhabited except for occasional use of the former store and manager's house as shelters by Inuit caribou hunters from Taloyoak, and a small settlement at Creswell Bay, which after 1967 consisted solely of the family of Timothy Idlout and Naomi Nangat. The Idlout family left Somerset Island in 1991, leaving it completely uninhabited. In 2006, CBC's The National included Fort Ross in a special series focused on climate change.

Tourism

Arctic Watch Lodge, a tourism establishment built in 1992, is located on Somerset Island. Arctic Watch was established at Cunningham Inlet because of the large number of beluga whales that congregate there in the summer. Arctic Watch Lodge is operated by Richard Weber and Josée Auclair. There is a private airstrip at the site, Arctic Watch Lodge Aerodrome.

See also

 Desert island
 List of islands

References

Further reading

 Migratory Bird Population Surveys in the District of Keewatin and Somerset Island, 1976 - AIPP Preliminary Report 1977, 1978
 Canadian Oceanographic Data Centre. Stanwell-Fletcher Lake, Somerset Island, N.W.T, 1965-1966 CODC References: 07-65-002, 07-66-002, Ottawa, ON: Queen's Printer, 1968
 
 
 Savelle, James M.; Cultural and Natural Formation Processes of a Historic Inuit Snow Dwelling Site, Somerset Island, Arctic Canada, American Antiquity, Vol. 49, No. 3, 1984
 VanStone, James W.; Anderson, James E.; and Merbs, C. F.; An Archaeological Collection from Somerset Island and Boothia Peninsula, N.W.T, Toronto, ON, 1962

External links

 CBC.ca In Depth: Northwest Passage 
 Somerset Island (Nunavut) in the Atlas of Canada - Toporama; Natural Resources Canada

Uninhabited islands of Qikiqtaaluk Region